The Prabhu Linga Leelai   Venpaas  in Tamil written by Siva Prakasar also called as 'Siva anuputhi selvar, 'Karpanai Kalangiyam', 'Thurai mangalam Sivaprakasar'. He compiled more than thirty original works and few more translation works from Kannada and Sanskrit.

Overview
Those  poems  were compiled as Venpa, Viruthan, Kalithurai, Agaval… It's a translation work. Prabhulinga Leelai, the work that the following translation comes from, chronicles the life and deeds of Allama Prabhu, a 12th-century Lingayata saint and teacher. There are two traditions regarding AllamaPrabhu's life. One sees himas a manifestation of Siva Himself who came to the world to teach the path of freedom.

The Original Version
"Prabhu Linga Leelai" is a 15th-century Lingayata work, written in Kannada and comprising 1,111 verses. It was originally composed when a Lingayata scholar,
Chamarasa, was challenged to produce a work that was greater than either the
Mahabharata or the Ramayana by vaishnava courtiers headed by arch rival Kumaravyasa. Shortly afterwards the troubled Chamarasa had a divine dream
in which Virabhadra, the son of Siva, asked him
to write a long poem on the Lingayata saints of the 12th century. Chamarasa subsequently composed the entire Prabhulinga Leelai
in eleven days. The book is based on the life and spiritual experiences of Allama Prabhu and his coequal Sharanas. The poet laureate presented it at the court of his king Deva Raya II where it was approved
by both the monarch and the vaishnava scholars who had challenged him.

Poet
Siva prakasar, Shaiva Siddhanta.
This great work was translated into Tamil by one Thuraimangalam Sivaprakasa Swamigal, in the 17th century. The author of the Tamil version, Siva prakasa Swamigal, had a strong connection with Tiruvannamalai. His father, Kumaraswami Desikar, used to come to Arunachala from Kanchipuram every year for the Deepam
festival. It is said that his three sons, of whomSivaprakasa Swamigal was the eldest, were all born by the grace of
Arunachala. When Sivaprakasa Swamigal grew up, he had a Guru in Tiruvannamalai —also called Sivaprakasa —whom he visited regularly. On his first Pradakshina of Arunachala, Sivaprakasa Swamigal composed Sonasaila Malai, a hundred-verse poem in praise of Arunachala.

Last Days
Sivaprakasa Swamigal died when he was  thirty-two.

Bhagavan Ramana mentioned Prabhu Linga Leelai
Bhagavan Ramana has highly influenced by this epic poem and hero of that poem Allama Prabhu, a 12th Century Poet from Karnataka and he mentioned about this work on many occasions and these are recorded in Talks, At the Feet of Bhagavan, and  Crumbs from His Table.  Recently, Dr. Prasanna Santhekadur's book, Ettana Allama Ettana Ramana?(Allama Prabhu and Ramana Maharshi, how are they related?) clearly shows the major influence of Allama Prabhu on Ramana Maharshi. Two of its verses are the source of Verse 20, of Sad Darsanam, Supplement. Bhagavan's compositions (Ulladu Narpadu Anubandham verse 20), and the chapter entitled 'Gorakkar Gati', part of which is translated here, was narrated by Bhagavan in Crumbs from his Table (pp. 36–39). A synopsis of the ma in story of this chapter —
the meeting between AllamaPrabhu and Gorakkar —also appears in
Talks with Sri Ramana Maharshi, Talk 334

Gorakkar is a saint whose samadhi is situated 6 km from Nagapattinam of Tamil Nadu and can be accessed by buses traversing from Nagapattinam to Vedaranyam. People throng the site during Amavasya and Poornima. It is informed that the transformation of DNA of human soul happens by the physical presence of oneself there in the Samadhi by the Hindu Saints. One can feel the bliss on reaching the Sea around and near the Samadhi, which cannot be explained in words as the Messengers like Gorakkar who bring the presence of God to the world and they are beyond Nama Swaroopa beyond words and pictures that can be grasped by common mind.

Verses and Explanation
Sivaprakasa Swamigal follows this tradition in Prabhulinga Leelai. The other version of his life, which is found in a fifteenth-century biography by Harihara, describes a more normal upbringing in the family of a temple drummer. Whatever the truth of the matter, there is general agreement that he was one of the most eminent saints, poets and Gurus of the Lingayata school. More details of
his life will be given in the notes to the verses.

Each Venpa of  'Prabhu Linga Leelai' is generally named by the first few words of the poem. These are given first and a translation into verse given then:-

Translations
Some verses have been translated by Robert Butler, T.V. Venkatasubramanian and David Godman and an article appears in Advent 2005 issue of Mountain Path.

References

Tamil-language literature
Shaiva texts
Tamil philosophy
17th-century Indian books